Dais Col is an ice-free col at , connecting the east edge of the Labyrinth and the west edge of the Dais, in Wright Valley, Victoria Land. It was named by the Advisory Committee on Antarctic Names (1997) in association with the Dais.

References
 

Mountain passes of Victoria Land
McMurdo Dry Valleys